Claus Bertino (born 2 June 1980) is a Danish former professional boxer.

Amateur career
Bertino won a silver medal at the 2002 Acropolis Boxing Cup, held from May 29 to June 3 in Athens, Greece. Bertino was competing in the Super heavyweight category and was defeated by Roberto Cammarelle of Italy in final.

Professional career
Bertino turned professional winning his first fight in Brondbyhallen, Copenhagen, Denmark, when he beat Zoltan Komlosi by knockout.

Title fight
Bertino has only performed in one fight for a title belt, when he participated for the vacant Danish Heavyweight title, in December 2006 at the Antvorskovhallen, Slagelse, Denmark.

Bertino was the victor with a spectacular first-round knockout win over Steffen Nielsen.

In his next fight he lost to a knockout defeat at the hands of little known fighter Humberto Evora and that effectively ended his world dreams.

External links
 

Living people
1980 births
Heavyweight boxers
Danish male boxers
Sportspeople from Frederiksberg